Lysmata boggessi is a species of saltwater shrimp first classified as Lysmata wurdemanni. It is found in shallow waters of the Atlantic Ocean, and can be distinguished by its coloration pattern.

References

Further reading
Zhang, Dong, Andrew L. Rhyne, and Junda Lin. "Density-dependent effect on reproductive behaviour of Lysmata amboinensis and L. boggessi (Decapoda: Caridea: Hippolytidae)." Journal of the Marine Biological Association of the United Kingdom 87.02 (2007): 517-522.
Baeza, J. Antonio, et al. "Molecular phylogeny of shrimps from the genus Lysmata (Caridea: Hippolytidae): the evolutionary origins of protandric simultaneous hermaphroditism and social monogamy." Biological Journal of the Linnean Society 96.2 (2009): 415-424.
Zhang, Dong, et al. "Surface glycoproteins are not the contact pheromones in the Lysmata shrimp." Marine biology 157.1 (2010): 171-176.
Calado, Ricardo, Gisela Dionísio, and Maria Teresa Dinis. "Starvation resistance of early zoeal stages of marine ornamental shrimps Lysmata spp.(Decapoda: Hippolytidae) from different habitats." Journal of Experimental Marine Biology and Ecology 351.1 (2007): 226-233.

External links

WORMS

Alpheoidea
Crustaceans described in 2006